Pollok is an unincorporated community in Angelina County, Texas, United States. According to the Handbook of Texas, the community had a population of 300 in 2000. It is located within the Lufkin, Texas micropolitan area.

History
The area around Pollok was first settled in the 1880s and was established as a sawmill center when Richard Blair built one on the railroad about six miles northwest of Clawson. A post office was established in 1886. There were two general stores and a successful sawmill in 1888. A lumber company called the J.A. Young Lumber Company built a mill larger than the original one and was sold to the Bodan Lumber Company in 1899 for $25,000. This company leased land from a man named Henry Claybon for 200 lbs. of salt pork and 4 barrels of flour to be paid annually while the mill was in operation or for 99 years. That same year, mill employees and farmers worked together to build a -by- church that was built with green boxing boards topped with pine shingles. This church building housed Methodist, Baptist and Presbyterian congregations, which rotated every Sunday. It was also used as a voting place and a shelter used for the presentation of traveling shows. The mill then burned down and was sold to two Bodan stockholders named A. Harris and L. Lipsitz. They then built a small mill, cut the remaining lumber, and shut it down. Pollok continued to survive with only portable mills operating and the post office remaining in operation in 1986. Pollok had six businesses and 100 residents in the 1930s. It lost a business in 1964, but the population grew to 350. In 1982 and 1990, Pollok had a population of approximately 300 and three businesses. It still had 300 residents in 2000, but grew to have 48 businesses.

Pollok gets its supplies from a small grocery store named The 69 Store which was founded by the Young family.

Although Pollok is unincorporated, it has a post office, with the ZIP Code of 75969.

The Light of Saratoga has been reported to be seen from Pollok on the Bodan.

The Texas Department of Transportation shows three cemeteries near Pollok on an Angelina County map.

During the tornado outbreak of April 13-15, 2019, two children aged 3 and 8 were killed in Pollok after a tree fell on and crushed the vehicle they were riding in.

Geography

Climate
The climate in this area is characterized by hot, humid summers and generally mild to cool winters. According to the Köppen Climate Classification system, Pollok has a humid subtropical climate, abbreviated "Cfa" on climate maps.

Education
A church built in the community in 1899 was also used as a school. The Central Independent School District serves area students.

Media
KLTV and KTRE maintain studios and radio transmitters in the community.

References

Unincorporated communities in Texas
Unincorporated communities in Angelina County, Texas